Ab van Oorschot (7 December 1952) is a retired professional footballer for FC Dordrecht and SC Telstar. His position was midfielder. He also coached football and worked as a plumber.

Footballer career 
After playing in a Feyenoord youth team, Van Oorschot played in the FC Dordrecht first squad from 1970 until 1977. On 5 December 1971, he scored the finishing touch in the 2–0 defeat of PEC Zwolle in the sixth round of the Eerste Divisie. 

Van Oorschot played for SC Telstar from 1977 to 1981. At Telstar, he was the captain of the team. He returned to FC Dordrecht from 1981 to 1983, and continued his player career at Fluks Dordrecht until 1986.

Manager career 
In 1986, Van Oorschot became head coach of IFC. In 1989, he changed to VV Groote Lindt. Later, he briefly coached VV 's-Gravendeel. In 2009, Van Oorschot, as caretaker manager, brought IFC through playoffs for the first time in its long history to the Eerste Klasse.

References 

1952 births
FC Dordrecht players
SC Telstar players
Ido's Football Club managers
Dutch footballers
Plumbers
Dutch football managers
Living people
Feyenoord players